The Catholic Church in Mayotte is part of the worldwide Catholic Church, under the spiritual leadership of the Pope in Rome.

The population of Mayotte is approximately 3% Catholic and other Christian denominations, with the majority of Mahorians being Sunni Muslim.

Classification
Apostolic Vicariate
 Apostolic Vicariate of the Comoros Archipelago

References